The Vietnam War has been depicted in many games.

Video games
While not as popular a topic as World War II and fictional wars set in modern times the Vietnam War has been the setting for numerous video games.

Cancelled titles

Mods

Digital board games

Lock 'n Load Publishing's LnLT Digital series
Lock 'n Load Tactical Digital: Core Game (2020)
 3+ DLC expansions (2020 to 2020's)

Other digital board games
Rock'n'Roll: Card Wargame (TBA)

Action-adventure game
Rambo (1987)
Magicka: Vietnam (2011)
When I Was Young (2020)

Run and gun
M.I.A.: Missing in Action (1989)

Top-down shooter
Rambo (1985)
Rambo (MSX)
Rambo: First Blood Part II (1986)
Operation: Vietnam (2007)
Hotline Miami 2: Wrong Number (2015)

Rail shooters
Soldier Boyz (FMV rail shooter) (1997)
Vietnam: Ho Chi Minh Trail (2003)
Rambo (2008 video game) (2008) (Light gun arcade game)
Rambo: The Video Game (2014)

Arcade video games
NAM-1975 (1990)
NAM (video game) (1998)
Vietnam: Black Ops (2000)
Vietnam 2: Special Assignment (2001) (In the game, it is called Vietnam 2: Black Ops Special Assignment or Vietnam: Black Ops 2)
Eve of Destruction Classic (2003) (Mod for Battlefield 1942)
Battlefield Vietnam (2004)
Eve of Destruction Vietnam (2004) (Mod for Battlefield Vietnam)
Marine Heavy Gunner: Vietnam (2004)
Shellshock: Nam '67 (2004)
Made Man (video game) (2006)
Eve of Destruction 2 (2007) (Mod for Battlefield 2)
The Hell in Vietnam (2008)
Shellshock 2: Blood Trails (2009)
Tunnel Rats: 1968 (2009)
Call of Duty: Black Ops (2010)
Battlefield: Bad Company 2: Vietnam (2010)
7554: Glorious Memories Revived (2011)
Call of Duty: Black Ops: Declassified (2012)
Vietnam War: The Last Battle (2017)
Nam - The Resistance War (2018)
Far Cry 5: Hours of Darkness (2018)
Eve of Destruction Redux (2018)
Nam - Bare Feet Iron Will (2018)
Call of Duty: Black Ops Cold War (2020)
Soldiers Of Vietnam - American Campaign (2020)
VNW - To be determined to fight (2020)
Red Storm : Vietnam War (2021)
Military Conflict: Vietnam (2022)

Tactical shooter games
The Vietcong series
Vietcong (video game) (2003)
Vietcong: Fist Alpha (2004)
Vietcong: Red Dawn (2005)
Vietcong 2 (2005)
Vietcong 2: Fist Bravo (2006)

Other tactical shooters
Line of Sight: Vietnam (2003)
Conflict: Vietnam (2004)
Men of Valor (2004)
Elite Warriors: Vietnam (2005)
PunjiVR (2022)
Operation: Rolling Stone (2023) (DLC for Operation: Harsh Doorstop (2023))

Management simulations
VC (1982)
'Nam 1965-1975 (1991)

Military simulations
Project Reality (2005)
Rising Storm 2: Vietnam (2017)
Arma 3 Creator DLC: S.O.G. Prairie Fire (2021)

Jet simulators
Flight of the Intruder (video game) (1990) (aka. Flight of the Intruder: The Air War in Vietnam)
Flight of the Intruder (1991 NES game. aka Phantom Air Mission.)
Chuck Yeager's Air Combat (1991)
Vietnam (1995 video game) (1995)
Wings Over Vietnam (2004)
Strike Fighters 2: Vietnam (2009) (Enhanced edition of Wings Over Vietnam)
Gunship III (2012)
Air Conflicts: Vietnam (2013) (Also under helicopter sims list)

Helicopter simulators
LHX Attack Chopper (1990)
M.I.A.: Missing in Action (1998)
Search & Rescue: Vietnam Med Evac (2002)
Whirlwind over Vietnam (2006)
Air Conflicts: Vietnam (2013) (Also under jet sims list)

Naval simulators
Gunboat (video game) (1990)

Real-time tactics games 
Green Berets (2001)
Men of War: Vietnam (2011)
Vietnam '65 (2017) (Enhanced port of Men of War: Vietnam content into Men of War: Assault Squad 2)
Vietnam at War (2022) (Mod for MoW: AS 2)

Real-time strategy games 
Platoon (2002 video game) (2002)
Rise of Nations: Thrones and Patriots (2004) (Expansion)
War Over Vietnam (2004)
Tactical Heroes 2: Platoons (2018)
Radio Commander (2019)
The 'Nam: Vietnam Combat Operations (2020) (Free standalone mod for Command & Conquer: Tiberian Sun)
Leave No One Behind: Ia Drang (2022)

Wargame (video games)

Talonsoft's The Operational Art of War series 
Early series titles between 1998-2000 published by Talonsoft. TOAW III (2006) was the last Talonsoft-developed series title.
Norm Koger's The Operational Art of War Vol 1: 1939-1955 - Battle Pack I Scenario Add-on Disk (1999) (Expansion for 1st TOAW (1999) title)
The Operational Art of War II: Modern Battles 1956–2000 (1999)
The Operational Art of War II: Flashpoint Kosovo (1999) (Expansion)
The Operational Art of War: Century of Warfare (2000) (Collection of 1st 2 TOAW full games & expansions)
The Operational Art of War Vol 1: 1939-1955 - Elite★Edition (2000) (Compilation of 1st full TOAW game & expansion)
The Operational Art of War Vol 1: 1939-1955 - Wargame of the Year Edition (2000) Similar to Elite★Edition (2000) but with added scenarios)
Norm Koger's The Operational Art of War III (2006) (First series title to be released by a different publisher, Matrix Games)
The Operational Art of War IV (2017)

JTS/WDS' Squad Battles Series 
(John Tiller Software/Wargame Design Studio's series)
First 3 Vietnam War-themed Squad Battles titles were 1st published by HPS Simulations.
Squad Battles: Vietnam (2001)
Squad Battles: Tour of Duty (2002)
Squad Battles: Dien Bien Phu (2009)

Other wargames (video games) 
Conflict in Vietnam (1986) (Alt titles: Conflict in Vietnam: Your Personal Time Machine into History!, Conflict in Vietnam: The Strategic War Simulation)
NAM (1986)
Steel Panthers II: Modern Battles (1996)
Modern Air Power: War Over Vietnam (2004)
Air Assault Task Force (2006)
Viet-Afghan (2010) (Third-party content pack for Hearts of Iron II & Arsenal of Democracy)
Vietnam ‘65 (2015)
Combat Actions: Vietnam (2019)
Campaign Series Vietnam 1948-1967 (2022)

Board games

References

Vietnam War games
Video game lists by theme